Anders Johnson (born April 23, 1989) is an American ski jumper who has competed since 2002. Competing in two Winter Olympics, he earned his best finish of 11th in the team large hill at Vancouver in 2010. Johnson also finished 49th in the individual normal hill at those same games.

He finished 40th in the individual large hill event and 48th in the individual normal hill event at the FIS Nordic World Ski Championships 2009 in Liberec.

Johnson's best World Cup finish was 29th in the individual large hill event at Whistler Olympic Park in January 2009.

He attended The Winter Sports School in Park City, graduating in 2006.

External links
 
 
 
 
  January 20, 2010. Retrieved January 21, 2010.
 

1989 births
Living people
American male ski jumpers
Olympic ski jumpers of the United States
People from Plattsburgh, New York
Ski jumpers at the 2006 Winter Olympics
Ski jumpers at the 2010 Winter Olympics
Ski jumpers at the 2014 Winter Olympics
Sportspeople from New York (state)